The Belgian Chess Championship is a championship organised yearly by the Koninklijke Belgische Schaakbond/Fédération Royale Belge des Echecs (Royal Belgium Chess Federation). The winner of the championship is awarded the title: Chess Champion of Belgium.

The first unofficial tournaments were organised by the Cercle des Echecs de Bruxelles (the Chess Club of Brussels). In 1920 the "Fédération Belge des Echecs" (Belgium Chess Federation) was established under the supervision of the four principal chess clubs in Belgium at that time: Brussels, Antwerp, Ghent and Liège. The first official Belgian championship was played in 1921. Two titles were awarded: the title of Champion of Belgium and the title Champion of the Belgium Chess Federation. The title champion of Belgium was reserved for players of the Belgian nationality, whereas non-Belgians could win the championship of the federation. A separate Belgian championship for women was established in 1938. In 1970 the Fédération Belge des Echecs was renamed the Fédération Royale Belge des Echecs and from then on there is only one title, the Chess Champion of Belgium.

 In 1936 there were three Belgian championships, because of fact that some players did not agree with the BSF's way of organising the championship and decided to hold their own. They held actually two: one where only Belgian players were allowed and one international championship.

Winners
{| class="sortable wikitable"
! Year !! City (Men) !! Champion of Belgium !! Women's Champion !! Champion of the federation
|-
|1901 || Brussels || Eugène Pécher  || ||
|-
|1905 || Brussels || E. E. Middleton || ||
|-
|1906 || Brussels || E. E. Middleton || ||
|-
|1913 || Brussels || (F-H. Königs) || ||
|-
| || || || 
|-
|1921 || Brussels || Nicholas Borochovitz || || Nicholas Borochovitz
|-
|1922 || Antwerp || Edgard Colle || || Edgard Colle
|-
|1923 || Ghent || George Koltanowski || || George Koltanowski
|-
|1924 || Brussels || Edgard Colle || || Edgard Colle
|-
|1925 || Brussels || Edgard Colle || || Edgard Colle
|-
|1926 || || - || || Edgard Colle
|-
|1927 || Ghent || (George Koltanowski) || || -
|-
|1928 || Ghent || Edgard Colle || || Edgard Colle
|-
|1929 || Antwerp, Brussels || Edgard Colle || || Edgard Colle
|-
|1930 || Verviers || George Koltanowski || || George Koltanowski
|-
|1931 || Brussels || Marcel Barzin || || Marcel Barzin
|-
|1932 || Brussels || J. Kornreich || || Boruch Israel Dyner  Victor Soultanbeieff
|-
|1933 || Brussels || Paul Devos || || Boruch Israel Dyner
|-
|1934 || Liège || - || || Victor Soultanbeieff
|-
|1935 || Antwerp || Arthur Dunkelblum || || Boruch Israel Dyner
|-
|1936 || Ghent || George Koltanowski || || George Koltanowski
|-
| * || Brussels || Albéric O'Kelly de Galway|| || Paul Devos
|-
|1937 || Brussels || Albéric O'Kelly de GalwayPaul Devos || || Albéric O'Kelly de GalwayPaul Devos 
|-
|1938 || Namur ||  Albéric O'Kelly de Galway || Marianne Stoffels || Albéric O'Kelly de Galway
|-
|1939 || || - || Marianne Stoffels || -
|-
|1940 || Ghent || Paul Devos || Marianne Stoffels  || Frits Van Seters
|-
|1941 || Brussels || Paul Devos || Elisabeth Cuypers  || Paul Devos
|-
|1942 || Brussels || Albéric O'Kelly de Galway || Marianne Stoffels || Frits Van Seters
|-
|1943 || Brussels || Albéric O'Kelly de Galway || Elisabeth Cuypers  || Victor Soultanbeieff
|-
|1944 || Brussels || Albéric O'Kelly de Galway || Marianne Stoffels || Louis Ambühl  Albéric O'Kelly de Galway
|-
|1945 || Ghent || Paul Devos || Elisabeth Cuypers || Paul Devos
|-
|1946 || Antwerp || Albéric O'Kelly de Galway || - || -
|-
|1947 || Ostend || Albéric O'Kelly de Galway || ? Spoormans ||  -
|-
|1948 || Bruges || Paul Devos || Simone Bussers  ||  -
|-
|1949 || Bruges || Arthur Dunkelblum || Simone Bussers || Frits Van Seters
|-
|1950 || Ghent || Robert Lemaire || Simone Bussers  || -
|-
|1951 || Verviers || Albéric O'Kelly de Galway || Simone Bussers ||  Albéric O'Kelly de Galway
|-
|1952 || Ghent || Albéric O'Kelly de Galway || Simone Bussers || Albéric O'Kelly de Galway
|-
|1953 || Eupen || Albéric O'Kelly de Galway || Simone Bussers  || Albéric O'Kelly de Galway
|-
|1954 || Bruges || Jos Gobert || Louise Loeffler || -
|-
|1955 || Merksem || Jos Gobert  || Louisa Ceulemans || -
|-
|1956 || Blankenberge || Albéric O'Kelly de Galway || Louisa Ceulemans || Albéric O'Kelly de Galway
|-
|1957 || Blankenberge || Albéric O'Kelly de Galway || Louisa Ceulemans || Victor Soultanbeieff
|-
|1958 || Blankenberge ||  Alfons Franck || Louise Loeffler || Jozef Boey
|-
|1959 || Blankenberge || Albéric O'Kelly de Galway  Jozef Boey || Louise Loeffler || Frits Van Seters
|-
|1960 || Ghent || Robert Willaert || Louise Loeffler || Nikola Karaklajic
|-
|1961 || Heist || Paul Limbos || Louise Loeffler ||  Victor Soultanbeieff
|-
|1962 || Brussels || Robert Willaert || - || Frits Van Seters
|-
|1963 || Ghent || Paul Limbos || - || Paul Limbos
|-
|1964 || Mechelen || Jozef Boey || E Lancel || Jozef Boey
|-
|1965 || Antwerp || Jozef Boey || - || Frits Van Seters
|-
|1966 || Brussels || François Cornelis || - || Frits Van Seters
|-
|1967 || Ostend || Jan Rooze || Louise Loeffler || Frits Van Seters
|-
|1968 || Brussels || Robert Willaert  Albert Vandezande || Elisabeth Cuypers || Y. Ebrahimi
|-
|1969 || Spa || Helmut Schumacher || - ||  Helmut Schumacher
|-
|1970 || Ghent || Karl Van Schoor || Caroline Vanderbeken ||  Frits Van Seters
|-
|1971 || Bredene || Jozef Boey  Roeland Verstraeten || -
|-
|1972 || Hasselt ||Friedhelm Freise || -
|-
|1973 || Ostend || Robert Willaert ||  -
|-
|1974 || Hasselt ||Jean Moeyersons || -
|-
|1975 || Ghent ||  Johan Goormachigh  José Tonoli  Henri Winants || Brenda Decorte
|-
|1976 || Ostend || Gunter Deleyn || -
|-
|1977 || Ostend || Ronald Weemaes || -
|-
|1978 || Eupen || Richard Meulders || -
|-
|1979 || Ghent || Gunter Deleyn || -
|-
|1980 || Sint-Niklaas || Alain Defize || Simonne Peeters
|-
|1981 || Sint-Niklaas || Richard Meulders  Ronny Weemaes || Simonne Peeters
|-
|1982 || Zwijnaarde || Johan Goormachtigh  Thierry Penson || Brenda Decorte
|-
|1983 || Veurne || Richard Meulders  Alain Defize || Simonne Peeters
|-
|1984 || Huy ||  Michel Jadoul || Simonne Peeters
|-
|1985 || Ghent || Richard Meulders || Isabel Hund
|-
|1986 || Anderlecht || Luc Winants || Viviane Caels
|-
|1987 || Ostend || Robert Schuermans || Viviane Caels
|-
|1988 || Huy || Michel Jadoul  Richard Meulders || Chantal Vandevoort
|-
|1989 || Ghent || Richard Meulders || Gina Lynne LoSasso
|-
|1990 || Brasschaat || Michel Jadoul || Martine Vanhecke
|-
|1991 || Geraardsbergen || Richard Meulders || Anne-Marie Maeckelbergh
|-
|1992 || Morlanwelz || Michel Jadoul || Martina Sproten
|-
|1993 || Visé || Gorik Cools || Greta Foulon
|-
|1994 || Charleroi || Ekrem Cekro || Greta Foulon
|-
|1995 || Geel || Ekrem Cekro  || Greta Foulon
|-
|1996 || Geel ||Marc Dutreeuw || Snezana Micic
|-
|1997 || Ghent || Juri Vetemaa  Ekrem Cekro || Snezana Micic
|-
|1998 || Liège || Ekrem Cekro  || Chantal Vandevoort
|-
|1999 || Geel || Pieter Claesen  Serge Vanderwaeren || Iris Neels
|-
|2000 || Ghent || Vladimir Chuchelov || Irina Gorshkova
|-
|2001 || Charleroi ||Mikhail Gurevich || Irina Gorshkova
|-
|2002 || Borgerhout || Alexandre Dgebuadze || Sophie Brion
|-
|2003 || Eupen || Geert Van der Stricht || Irina Gorshkova
|-
|2004 || Westerlo || Bart Michiels || Heidi Vints
|-
|2005 || Aalst || Alexandre Dgebuadze || Elena Van Hoecke
|-
|2006 || Namur || Shahin Mohandesi || Marigje Degrande
|-
|2007 || Namur || Alexandre Dgebuadze || Marigje Degrande
|-
|2008 || Eupen || Bruno Laurent || Wiebke Barbier and Marigje Degrande
|-
|2009 || Namur || Mher Hovhanisian || Hanne Goossens
|-
|2010 || Westerlo || Mher Hovhanisian || Wiebke Barbier
|-
|2011 || Westerlo || Bart Michiels || Anna Zozulia
|-
|2012 || Lommel || Tanguy Ringoir || Wiebke Barbier
|-
|2013 || Antwerp || Tanguy Ringoir || Irina Gorshkova
|-
|2014 || Charleroi || Geert Van der Stricht || Astrid Barbier
|-
|2015 || Schelle || Mher Hovhanisian  || Hanne Goossens
|-
|2016 || Buetgenbach || Tanguy Ringoir   || Hanne Goossens
|-
|2017 || Niel || Mher Hovhanisian ||Wiebke Barbier
|-
|2018 ||  Charleroi||  Mher Hovhanisian||Hanne Goossens
|-
|2019 ||Roux  || Daniel Dardha||
|-
|2020
|Bruges
|Alexandre Dgebuadze 
|
|-
|2021
|
|Daniel Dardha
|
|-
|2022
|
|Daniel Dardha
|
|}

References

 Etienne Cornil (2007) Les Championnats de Belgique d'Echecs (1901 à 2007), Cercle Royal des Echecs de Bruxelles,   .
 Palmaressen Partial winners list of the championship
 Larousse du jeu d'Échecs (1997)
 Portret  Albéric O’Kelly de Galway
 2008 edition
 Belgian Chess Championship 2009

Chess national championships
Women's chess national championships
Championship
1921 in chess
Recurring sporting events established in 1921
Chess
1921 establishments in Belgium